Doha Port is a port in Kuwait located at the western extremity of the Capital Governorate. Among its facilities are 11 warehouses, a cattle pen and four storage sheds. To the immediate south of the port are residences which accommodate 573 people as of 2011.

See also
Doha (Kuwait)

References

Ports and harbours of Kuwait
Suburbs of Kuwait City